Bristol Aerodrome  is a small private airfield located adjacent to Bristol, New Brunswick, Canada.

References

Registered aerodromes in New Brunswick
Buildings and structures in Carleton County, New Brunswick
Transport in Carleton County, New Brunswick